KOTI (channel 2) is a television station in Klamath Falls, Oregon, United States, affiliated with NBC and owned by California Oregon Broadcasting, Inc. The station maintains a news bureau on South 7th Street in downtown Klamath Falls, and its transmitter is located atop Stukel Mountain.

KOTI operates as a full-time satellite of Medford-licensed company flagship KOBI (channel 5), whose studios are located on South Fir Street in downtown Medford. KOTI covers areas of southwest and south-central Oregon that receive a marginal to non-existent over-the-air signal from KOBI, although there is significant overlap between the two stations' contours otherwise. KOTI is a straight simulcast of KOBI; on-air references to KOTI are limited to Federal Communications Commission (FCC)-mandated hourly station identifications during newscasts and other programming.

Overview
The station was founded on August 12, 1956, by William B. Smullin. The call letters KOTI are believed to have come from the city's local four-year college, the Oregon Institute of Technology (formerly Oregon Technical Institute). Originally, KOTI carried all three networks.

Today, the station is owned by president Patricia C. "Patsy" Smullin, who also owns the parent company COBi, which is the longest, continuously independent broadcast group in the West and one of the three oldest in the country. KOTI served as the only staffed television station in the Klamath Basin for many years. The station's vice president and general manager is Robert Wise, formerly longtime general manager of KRCR-TV in Redding, California, former sister station to KOTI. Viewers in 12 counties in Oregon and California receive programming from NBC 2.

News operation
KOTI previously produced its own newscasts (separate from KOBI) focusing on the eastern portion of the Medford–Klamath Falls market. The newscasts included NBC 2 News at 5:00 p.m., 6:00 p.m. and at 11:00 p.m. anchored by Art Barron and Kristin Hosfelt. The chief meteorologist was Adam Colpack. Lyle Ahrens had served as the Klamath Basin news bureau chief, but retired in 2020.

At one time, KOTI aired a separate newscast at 6:30 p.m. with its own news bureau before becoming a repeater of KOBI.

Technical information

Subchannels
The station's digital signal is multiplexed:

Analog-to-digital conversion
KOTI shut down its analog signal, over VHF channel 2, on February 17, 2009, the original target date in which full-power television stations in the United States were to transition from analog to digital broadcasts under federal mandate (which was later pushed back to June 12, 2009). The station's digital signal remained on its pre-transition VHF channel 13, using PSIP to display the station's virtual channel as its former VHF analog channel 2.

Translators

See also
 KOBI
 California Oregon Broadcasting, Inc. (ownership)

References

External links
Official website
Bill Smullin: Southern Oregon TV's pioneer

Television channels and stations established in 1956
Klamath Falls, Oregon
OTI
Cozi TV affiliates
Quest (American TV network) affiliates
Twist (TV network) affiliates
1956 establishments in Oregon
NBC network affiliates